Korea Automobile Racing Association (KARA) (대한 자동차 경주 협회) is the non-profit organization that has been the custodian of motor sport in Korea. It was founded in May 1996 under Article 32 of the Civil Act of the Ministry of Culture and Sports. Its purpose is to enable the spread of automobile games as a national mass sport.

It is an national sporting authority (ASN) that is exclusively delegated by the Fédération Internationale de l'Automobile (FIA, English: 'International Automobile Federation') that grants rights to 'one country, one organization'. It licenses racing drivers and officials in Korea and authorizes auto racing.

KARA, together with in excess of 120 other ASNs in over 100 nations, are committed to carrying out the mission of the FIA which is to ensure that motor sport is conducted in accordance with the highest standards of safety, fairness and social responsibility. KARA also aims for the expansion of Korean cultural sports and the development of Korean motor sport through automobile races. It also ensures that the automobile races are distributed through education, training and fostering local players and other affiliated persons.

KARA also officially recognized Korean Olympic Committee in 2015. The current organization president is Kwan Soo Shon.

References

External links
 The KARA's official website
 The FIA's official website

National sporting authorities of the FIA
Sports governing bodies in South Korea